Li Fanrong is the chief executive officer (CEO) of China National Offshore Oil Corporation, a state-owned Chinese oil and gas producer, and a Fortune Global 500 company.

He has been CEO of China National Offshore Oil since 25 November 2011, when he succeeded Yang Hua.

References

Living people
Year of birth missing (living people)
Place of birth missing (living people)
China National Offshore Oil Corporation